Riel de Kock (born 12 December 1983) is a South African cricketer. He played 27 first-class and 24 List A matches between 2004 and 2010. He was also part of South Africa's squad for the 2002 Under-19 Cricket World Cup.

References

External links
 

1983 births
Living people
South African cricketers
Free State cricketers
Griqualand West cricketers
Cricketers from Pretoria